William Edward Power (September 27, 1915 - November 29, 2003) was consecrated Bishop of the Diocese of Antigonish, Canada on July 20, 1960: installed August 10, 1960: resigned December 17, 1986. Power died in 2003.

References

External links
 Diocese of Antigonish

2003 deaths
20th-century Roman Catholic bishops in Canada
Participants in the Second Vatican Council
1915 births